Tudivasum is a genus of large sea snails, marine gastropod mollusks in the subfamily Vasinae, the vase shells, within the family Turbinellidae.

Species
Species within the genus Tudivasum include:
Tudivasum armigerum
Tudivasum inerme
Tudivasum kurtzi
Tudivasum rasilistoma
Tudivasum spinosum
 Tudivasum zanzibaricum

References

Turbinellidae